Lost and Found is a children's novel written by Andrew Clements, first published in 2008. It is about two boys, Ray and Jay Grayson, who are identical twins, and have always wondered what it is like to be a single person rather than "one of the Grayson twins".

References

2008 American novels
American children's novels
Books by Andrew Clements
Novels set in Ohio
Twins in fiction
2008 children's books
Atheneum Books books